Joule is a surname. Notable people with the surname include:

 Barry Joule (born 1954/55), Canadian writer
 James Prescott Joule (1818–1889), physicist and brewer
 John Joule, chemist
 Reggie Joule (born 1952), politician

Fictional characters:
 Yzak Joule, in the anime series Mobile Suit Gundam SEED
 Joule Adams, in ReCore